Hama Subdistrict  is a Syrian nahiyah (subdistrict) located in Hama District in Hama.  According to the Syria Central Bureau of Statistics (CBS), Hama Subdistrict had a population of 467254 in the 2004 census.

References 

Hama
Hama District